Martynas "Marty" Gecevičius (born May 16, 1988) is a Lithuanian professional basketball player for Juventus Utena of the Lithuanian Basketball League (LKL).

Professional career
Gecevičius debuted in the EuroLeague during the 2007–08 season, averaging 3.2 points per game, which he increased to 14.2 points per game in the 2009–10 season, making him a desirable player in the 2010 summer transfer market. His Euroleague career high is 21 points, scored against Efes. During the 2010–11 season, he averaged 11.5 points per game in the LKL, and 9.3 points per game in the Baltic Basketball League.

After signing with Olympiacos, Gecevičius won the EuroLeague 2011–12 season championship, and the 2011–12 Greek League championship. He also won the 2012–13 season championship of the EuroLeague, with Olympiacos.

On July 31, 2013 it was announced that Gecevičius will return to Lietuvos rytas.

On July 9, 2015, Gecevičius signed with TED Ankara Kolejliler for the 2015–16 BSL season.

On August 19, 2016, he signed with Spanish club CAI Zaragoza. On May 16, 2017, Gecevičius was named best three-point shooter of the Liga Endesa.

On October 26, 2017, he signed with Polish club Stelmet Zielona Góra.

On September 16, 2018, Gecevičius returned to the Lithuanian league by signing with Skycop Prienai. He won the King Mindaugas Cup Three-Point Contest on 17 February, 2019.

On September 24, 2019, Gecevičius signed a one-year contract with Aris Thessaloniki of the Greek Basket League.

On July 9, 2020, Gecevičius signed a one-year deal with Juventus Utena of the Lithuanian Basketball League (LKL). On May 19, 2021, he re-signed with the club until the end of the 2022–2023 season.

National team career
At the 2010 FIBA World Championship, Gecevičius played for the senior Lithuanian national basketball team, which won Bronze medals. He was a candidate to be on the Lithuania national team roster for EuroBasket 2011. He was also a candidate to be on Lithuanian roster for EuroBasket 2013, however on August 22, 2013, it was announced that he left the national team, due to head coach Jonas Kazlauskas' decision. 

In 2015, he was included into the national team's extended candidates list, but was not invited to the training camp.

Career statistics

EuroLeague

|-
| style="text-align:left;"| 2007–08
| style="text-align:left;"| Lietuvos Rytas
| 18 || 0 || 9.3 || .500 || .393 || 1.000 || .7 || .1 || .4 || .0 || 3.2 || 2.6
|-
| style="text-align:left;"| 2009–10
| style="text-align:left;"| Lietuvos Rytas
| 10 || 10 || 33.7 || .476 || .452 || .889 || 2.9 || 3.3 || 1.3 || .0 || 14.2 || 14.5
|-
| style="text-align:left;"| 2010–11
| style="text-align:left;"| Lietuvos Rytas
| 15 || 9 || 28.8 || .462 || .412 || .839 || 3.0 || 2.6 || .5 || .1 || 11.7 || 12.6
|-
| style="text-align:left;background:#AFE6BA;"| 2011–12†
| style="text-align:left;"| Olympiacos
| 18 || 3 || 16.7 || .417 || .413 || .816 || 1.3 || .8 || .3 || .0 || 6.2 || 5.7
|-
| style="text-align:left;background:#AFE6BA;"| 2012–13†
| style="text-align:left;"| Olympiacos
| 15 || 0 || 6.0 || .174 || .222 || .750 || .8 || .3 || .1 || .0 || 1.0 || .3
|-
| style="text-align:left;"| 2013–14
| style="text-align:left;"| Lietuvos Rytas
| 10 || 9 || 29.1 || .443 || .443 || .792 || 2.7 || 2.0 || 1.2 || .0 || 12.4 || 12.1
|- class="sortbottom"
| style="text-align:center;" colspan=2| Career
| 86 || 31 || 18.8 || .443 || .413 || .848 || 1.7 || 1.3 || .6 || .0 || 7.3 || 7.1

Awards and achievements
Baltic League Presidents Cup Winner: (2008)
2× Baltic League Champion: (2007, 2009)
EuroCup Champion: (2009)
2× Lithuanian Federation Cup Winner: (2009, 2010)
2× Lithuanian League Champion: (2009, 2010)
2010 FIBA World Championship, Turkey: 
2× EuroLeague Champion: (2012, 2013)
Greek League Champion: (2012)

References

External links

Euroleague.net profile (archive)
Eurobasket.com profile
FIBA.com profile
RealGM.com profile

1988 births
Living people
2010 FIBA World Championship players
Aris B.C. players
Basket Zaragoza players
Basket Zielona Góra players
Basketball players from Vilnius
BC Juventus players
BC Prienai players
BC Rytas players
Greek Basket League players
Liga ACB players
Lithuanian expatriate basketball people in Greece
Lithuanian expatriate basketball people in Poland
Lithuanian expatriate basketball people in Spain
Lithuanian expatriate basketball people in Turkey
Lithuanian men's basketball players
Olympiacos B.C. players
Shooting guards
TED Ankara Kolejliler players